Amurai (birth name Manvel Ter-Pogosyan; born 1987) is an Armenian-American trance music producer, songwriter, and DJ currently residing in Sacramento, California.

Biography

As producer

Amurai was inspired to begin producing music by ATB's track, 9PM (Till I Come). In 2005 his first track was signed with the US duo Filo & Peri's label "Empire State Records". 'The Amurai EP', which was the title of that release, included two tracks, and was Amurai's first breakthrough release. Mixmag dance music magazine said "'Reminiscent of You' is a solid instrumental but it's 'Beautiful Dreamer' on the flip that steal the show. When the piano drops into the breakdown you'll get goosebumps." Two years following his first release, Amurai's collaboration with Static Blue led to their release of 'After the Sunrise' on Alter Ego Records. This track was remixed by Alex M.O.R.P.H & Woody Van Eyden, as well as Daniel Kandi. An ode to his native Armenia, 'Tears From Armenia', which uses the Armenian instrument duduk, was released on Solarstone's label "Deep Blue". In 2008, Amurai collaborated with Jenni Perez and Tiff Lacey, earning him two major releases with Armin Van Buuren's label Armada and Amon Vision, respectively. 'Fallen In Too Deep', which features Jenni Perez, has appeared on such compilations as Ibiza Trance Tunes 2009, Armada Trance 5 and 6, as well as Armada Night "The After."

Throughout his career, the young music producer managed to secure releases on some of Europe's most highly respectable electronic dance music labels such as Armada Recordings and Black Hole Recordings. Amurai, who often finds inspiration from his Armenian roots, has garnered immense support from high ranking DJs including Tiesto, Armin Van Buuren, ATB, Above & Beyond, Gareth Emery, Roger Shah, Andy Moor, and Dash Berlin among others. Furthermore, Ferry Corsten, a famed Dutch label owner and DJ, spotted Amurai and featured him in his highly regarded “Once Upon A Night” compilations. Amurai was the only artist to have two songs featured on each of the 2-part compilation series.

As performer

In the first quarter of 2009, Amurai started his DJ career by launching his own internationally broadcast electronic radio show called Amurai Global. For two years, the show aired on over 10 online and FM radio stations including Trance.fm, Pure.fm, Ensonic.fm, and Pulzar.fm and was also available as a podcast. One year later, Amurai joined the LMD Group in Los Angeles and claimed residency on Saturdays at Club Circus. His residency enabled him to DJ alongside artists such as Cosmic Gate, tyDi, Solarstone, Tritonal, Simon Patterson and Solarstone while representing the Trance music scene in Los Angeles. In 2011, Amurai was invited by ATB to participate in "ATB In Concert", hosted in Poznan, Poland, to play live piano and close the concert with a DJ set.

As songwriter

In 2011, Amurai contributed as a producer and songwriter in developing ATB's 9th studio artist album entitled "Distant Earth." The album peaked at #7 in the German mainstream Billboard Charts and later reached Gold status.

Songwriting and collaboration credits

Discography

Original releases

Remix releases

See also
 Tiff Lacey
 Masoud
 Tristraum

References

External links
 

Remixers
1987 births
Living people
Musicians from Yerevan
Armenian DJs
Armenian emigrants to the United States
American people of Armenian descent
American record producers
American trance musicians
Club DJs
Progressive house musicians
Electronic dance music DJs
Electronic music radio shows
Ableton Live users